is a railway station in Kita-ku, Hamamatsu,  Shizuoka Prefecture, Japan, operated by the third sector Tenryū Hamanako Railroad.

Lines
Fruitpark Station is served by the Tenryū Hamanako Line, and is located 36.2  kilometers from the starting point of the line at Kakegawa Station.

Station layout
The station has a single side platform with a small station building built directly on the platform. During national holidays it is a popular place for picnics and a station manager is temporarily installed.

Adjacent stations

|-
!colspan=5|Tenryū Hamanako Railroad

Station history
Fruitpark Station was established on March 18, 1996.

Passenger statistics
In fiscal 2016, the station was used by an average of 13 passengers daily (boarding passengers only).

Surrounding area
Hamamatsu Fruits Park Toki-no-sumika
Japan National Route 362

See also
 List of railway stations in Japan

External links

   Tenryū Hamanako Railroad Station information 
 

Railway stations in Shizuoka Prefecture
Railway stations in Japan opened in 1996
Stations of Tenryū Hamanako Railroad
Railway stations in Hamamatsu